The Old Clay County Courthouse in Clay, West Virginia was designed by Frank Packard and built in 1902.  The Beaux-Arts building was located on a hill overlooking the county seat. The courthouse was the site of three notable trials: the Sarah Ann Legg trial of 1905, the first trial of a woman in Clay County for murder, the Booger Hole trial of 1917, in which citizens nearly lynched the defendants, and the Oscar Bail trial of 1953, in which Bail was convicted of killing a mine guard in the Great Widen Coal Strike.
  
Since a new courthouse opened across the street, the old courthouse houses magistrate's offices and the county extension agent.

References

Beaux-Arts architecture in West Virginia
Buildings and structures in Clay County, West Virginia
County courthouses in West Virginia
Courthouses on the National Register of Historic Places in West Virginia
Frank Packard buildings
Government buildings completed in 1902
National Register of Historic Places in Clay County, West Virginia
1902 establishments in West Virginia